Chyhyryn is a city and historic site located in Cherkasy Raion of  Cherkasy Oblast of central Ukraine. From 1648 to 1669 the city was a Hetman residence. After a forced relocation of the Ruthenian Orthodox metropolitan see from Kyiv in 1658, it became a full-fledged capital of the Cossack Hetmanate. Chyhyryn also became a traditional place for the appointment to the office of Hetman of Zaporizhian Host. It hosts the administration of Chyhyryn urban hromada, one of the hromadas of Ukraine. Population:

Names 

Chyhyryn (Turkish: Çigirin or Çehrin) ).

Location 
The city is on the banks of Tiasmyn River and lies at an altitude of 124 metres above mean sea level. Minor industries, such as food and furniture factories, are the basis of the town economy in the 21st century.

History 
The area (1320–1569) had been part of the Grand Duchy of Lithuania. It was ceded to the Polish–Lithuanian Commonwealth (in the Kijów Voivodeship [Kyiv or Kiev] of the Crown of Poland) before the Union of Lublin. It was granted Magdeburg Rights in 1592 by Sigismund III Vasa.

Chyhyryn is first mentioned as a fortified Cossack winter station. In 1638, Bohdan Khmelnytsky became its starosta (regional leader), and in 1648 it became the newly elected Hetman's residence and the capital of the Cossack state, the Zaporozhian Host. During the Russo-Turkish War (1676–1681) it was the center of two bloody campaigns (1675–76 and 1677–78). In 1678 the castle of Chyhyryn was blown up by the retreating Russian garrison that was stationed there, while the Turkish forces sacked the rest of the city. After this, it gradually lost its significance. The city fell under Ottoman occupation but was later recovered by the Cossacks while the Ottomans were busy in the Battle of Vienna. It remained the center of the Chyhyryn regiment until 1712 and upon the final incorporation into the Russian Empire (1793) it became part of the Kyiv region.

In 1917 a congress of Free Cossacks took place in Chyhyryn. At that congress by tradition Pavlo Skoropadsky was elected as the Hetman of the Cossacks (later in 1918 in Kyiv, he was elected the Hetman of Ukraine as well).

During World War II, Chyhyryn was occupied by the German Army from August 7, 1941 to December 12, 1943.

In 1989 the population of the city was 12 853 people.

Until 18 July 2020, Chyhyryn served as an administrative center of Chyhyryn Raion. The raion was abolished in July 2020 as part of the administrative reform of Ukraine, which reduced the number of raions of Cherkasy Oblast to four. The area of Chyhyryn Raion was merged into Cherkasy Raion.

Climate

Notable people
Georgy Danilov, linguist
Kateryna Yushchenko, scientist

Landmarks
The Trinity Monastery, built near Chyhyryn in 1627, was later destroyed by the Soviet authorities. Other historical landmarks, such as the town hall and Khmelnytsky's palace, did not survive either. After Ukraine regained independence, Hetman's residence was restored and became a museum.

Gallery

International relations

Twin towns — Sister cities
Chyhyryn is twinned with:

References

External links
 Chyhyryn in the Encyclopedia of Ukraine
 Soviet topographic map 1:100,000
 

Cities in Cherkasy Oblast
Chigirinsky Uyezd
Kiev Voivodeship
Former national capitals
Former capitals of Ukraine
Cities of district significance in Ukraine
Cossack Hetmanate